Peddapuram mandal is one of the 21 mandals in Kakinada district of the state of Andhra Pradesh, India. Its headquarters are located at Peddapuram. The mandal is bounded by Gandepalle, Jaggampeta, Kirlampudi, Rangampeta, Samalkota and Pithapuram mandals.

Demographics 

 census, the mandal had a population of 123,399. The total  
population constitute, 61,713 males and 61,686 females —a sex ratio of 999 females per 1000  
males. 12,673 children are in the age group of 0–6 years, of which 6,532 are boys and 6,141 are girls —a ratio of 940 per 1000. The average literacy rate stands at 67.75% with 75,019
literates.

Towns and villages 

Kattamuru is the most populated village and Sirivada is the least populated settlement in the mandal.  census, the mandal has 8 settlements, that includes:

Sources:
 Census India 2011 (sub districts)

References

Mandals in Kakinada district